Konstantin Sergeyevich Pluzhnikov (born 28 April 1987 in Seversk) is a Russian gymnast. He is the 2011 European Champion on rings.

See also
List of Olympic male artistic gymnasts for Russia

References

External links
 
 
 

1987 births
Russian male artistic gymnasts
Gymnasts at the 2008 Summer Olympics
Olympic gymnasts of Russia
European champions in gymnastics
People from Seversk
Living people
Sportspeople from Tomsk Oblast
21st-century Russian people